Breeze is a brand of laundry detergent manufactured by Unilever that is currently marketed as the counterpart of OMO detergent for the Philippines, Singapore, Malaysia and Thailand markets.

History
Breeze was introduced by Lever Brothers Company in the United States in 1947 as a soapless cleansing agent. During April 1947, Breeze was launched in six cities in the Midwestern United States. The product had a capital investment of $2,000,000.

Breeze began with an advertising campaign in seventeen newspapers, covering six markets. The Federal Advertising Agency was responsible for advertising coordination. In 1956, a box of king size Breeze was offered with a free Cannon Mills Company bath towel and a fifty cent voucher for buying, in Albuquerque, New Mexico.

A commercial aired nationally as part of the CBS Television Network program Love is a Many Splendored Thing in December 1967 also featured the "free towel with every box" offer, and this commercial can be seen online on various websites such as the Internet Archive.

References

External links
 Breeze - Unilever Philippines
 Breeze - Unilever Singapore
 Breeze - Unilever Malaysia
 Breeze - Unilever Thailand

Unilever brands
Cleaning product brands
Laundry detergents